A Yellowbelly is a native-born resident of Copthorne, West Sussex, England. The origin of this nickname is uncertain, but a number of explanations have been offered. These include:

 The men of Copthorne used to smelt iron and make charcoal in the woods around the village, stripped to the waist, and their bellies turned yellow in the smoke;
Copthorne Rovers, a local soccer club, was known as the Yellow Bellies, and the nickname was then applied to the whole community;
 Bellies became yellow while crawling through fields of buttercups to poach game;
 In a local iron quarry, the men became covered in yellow dust;
 The gypsies on the common placed a gold sovereign on the belly buttons of their new-born children;
 The early Saxons living in this area used yellow ochre, found in the local clay, to colour the walls of their homes;
 An outsider wishing to marry a Copthorne girl had to cross their prospective bride's belly with gold sovereigns;
 The old villagers wore gold strapped to their bellies
 A scurrilous story was spread by the residents of the neighbouring village of Crawley Down about urination habits in Copthorne; and
Local smugglers would run away if they thought they were likely to be caught.

The Crooked Brook Beer Company Limited, a brewery in Copthorne, was known until 2014 as the Yellowbelly Brewery.

See also
 Yellowbelly (Lincolnshire)

References

External links
 Copthorne Village history page

History of West Sussex
Regional nicknames
Mid Sussex District